Ervin Elroy Cherry (born March 26, 1966) is an American serial killer who strangled three women to death in Florida between 1993 and 1994.

Early crimes 
Cherry previously served time in prison for assaulting someone on October 1, 1986. He was found guilty of aggravated battery with a deadly weapon and was sentenced to 10 years on May 4, 1987. Cherry was released from prison in the early 1990s.

Murders 
After being arrested on an auto theft charge in Savannah, Georgia on September 22, 1994, Cherry, who had been staying at a Salvation Army shelter, was implicated in the murders of two women in Florida. He was charged with two counts of  first degree murder and convicted of the November 22, 1993, slaying of Wanda Robinson in St. Johns County, and the February 5, 1994, slaying of Christina Cooper in Putnam County. He was sentenced to life in prison for those murders on January 13, 1995. While initially denying his involvement, Cherry later confessed to the February 1, 1994, murder of Katherine Walker in St. Johns County, saying he had killed her while arguing over a drug deal. He was convicted and received another life sentence for killing Walker in 2010.

See also 
 List of serial killers in the United States

References 

1966 births
20th-century American criminals
American people convicted of murder
American serial killers
Criminals from Florida
Living people
Male serial killers
Prisoners sentenced to life imprisonment by Florida
Violence against women in the United States